Roscoe Lee Browne (May 2, 1922 – April 11, 2007) was an American actor and director. He resisted playing stereotypically black roles, instead performing in several productions with New York City's Shakespeare Festival Theater, Leland Hayward's satirical NBC series That Was the Week That Was, and a poetry performance tour of the United States in addition to his work in television and film. He is perhaps best known for his role as Saunders in Soap (1979–1981).

In 1976, Browne was nominated for an Emmy Award for Outstanding Single Performance by a Supporting Actor in a Comedy or Drama Series for his work on ABC's Barney Miller. In 1986, he won the Emmy Award for Outstanding Guest Performer in a Comedy Series for his work on NBC's The Cosby Show. In 1992, he received a Tony Award nomination for Best Featured Actor in a Play for his performance as "Holloway" in August Wilson's Two Trains Running.

In 1995, he received a Daytime Emmy Award nomination for Outstanding Performer in an Animated Program for his performance as The Kingpin in Spider-Man.

Browne was inducted into the Black Filmmakers Hall of Fame in 1977 and posthumously inducted into the American Theater Hall of Fame in 2008.

Early life and education
Born in Woodbury, New Jersey, Browne was the fourth son of Baptist minister Sylvanus S. Browne and his wife Lovie (née Lovie Lee Usher). He graduated from Woodbury Junior-Senior High School in 1939. Browne attended historically black Lincoln University in Pennsylvania. While there, he became a member of the Omega Psi Phi fraternity and graduated with a bachelor's degree in 1946.

During World War II, Browne served in Italy with the United States Army's 92nd Infantry Division and organized the Division's track and field team. After the war, he undertook postgraduate work under the GI Bill at Middlebury College, Columbia University, and the University of Florence. A middle-distance runner, he won two Amateur Athletic Union 1,000-yard national indoor championships.

He occasionally returned to Lincoln University between 1946–52 to teach English, French, and comparative literature. Upon leaving academia, he earned a living for several years selling wine for Schenley Import Corporation. In 1956, he left his job with Schenley to become a full-time professional actor.

In 1950 and 1951 he toured Europe (as a half-miler) with a USA Track and Field team.

Career

Acting 
Despite the apprehensions of his friends, Browne managed to land the roles of soothsayer and Pindarus in Julius Caesar, directed by Joseph Papp for New York City's first Shakespeare Festival Theater. More work with the Shakespeare Festival Theater followed. Browne voiced an offscreen part as camera operator J.J. Burden in The Connection (1961), his first movie role. In The Cowboys (1972), in a role as a camp cook, he led a group of young cowhands avenging the death of John Wayne's character in the movie.

Browne was much in demand for narration and voice-over parts in film and on commercial sound recordings. In 1977, Browne narrated a record album, The Story of Star Wars, which presented an abridged version of the events depicted in the first released film using the dialogue and sound effects. The recording was produced by George Lucas and Alan Livingston.

Browne was determined not to accept the stereotypical roles routinely offered to African-American actors. He also wanted to do more than act and narrate. In 1966, he wrote and made his directorial stage debut with A Hand Is On The Gate, starring Cicely Tyson, James Earl Jones, and Moses Gunn. A lifelong bachelor who coveted his privacy in the turbulent decades of the civil rights revolution, Browne avoided participation in public protests, preferring instead to be "more effective on stage with metaphor...than in the streets with an editorial".

His stage success brought him to the attention of producer Leland Hayward, and in 1964 he began a regular stint as a cast member on Hayward's satirical NBC-TV series That Was the Week That Was. Starting in the late 1960s, Browne was a frequent guest star on TV in both comedy and dramatic shows such as Mannix, All in the Family, Maude, Good Times, Sanford and Son, The Cosby Show, A Different World and dozens of others. He also was a regular on Soap where he played Saunders, the erudite butler, from 1979 to 1981. Browne later guest-starred on Benson with Robert Guillaume, who had also been in the cast of Soap. Browne's appearances on The Cosby Show won him an Emmy Award in 1986 for his guest role as Professor Foster.

He and fellow actor Anthony Zerbe toured the United States with their poetry performance piece Behind the Broken Words. It included readings of poetry, some of it written by Browne, as well as performances of comedy and dramatic works.

Browne found additional success performing in the plays of August Wilson, both on Broadway and at the Pittsburgh Public Theater. He was described as having "a baritone voice like a sable coat", speaking the King's English with a strong mid-Atlantic accent. To someone who once said Browne sounded "too white", he replied, "I'm sorry, I once had a white maid." Four years before his death, Browne narrated a series of WPA slave narratives in the HBO film, Unchained Memories (2003).

Directing
Browne's directorial credits include a piece called An Evening of Negro Poetry and Folk Music at the Delacorte Theatre and the Public Theatre in New York City in 1966. It was also produced as A Hand Is on the Gate at the Longacre Theatre in New York City in 1966. The production was revived at the Afro-American Studio in New York City, running from 1976 to 1977.

Birth year

Some year-of-birth records, including the Social Security Death Index, report Browne born on May 2, 1922, while other sources claim that Browne's date of birth was three years later, on May 2, 1925. Those sources include The New York Times, Los Angeles Times, Variety, the Associated Press and several others, including a Congressional Resolution.

In an undated videotaped interview with Camille Cosby for the National Visionary Leadership Project (NVLP), Browne said: "I was born, Camille, so they say, May 2, 1922, in Woodbury, New Jersey."

Death
Browne died of stomach cancer at Cedars Sinai Medical Center in Los Angeles in the morning of April 11, 2007, aged 84. He never married and had no children.

He was remembered for his contributions in a New York Times encomium by Frank Crohn of the Edna St. Vincent Millay Society:

We mourn the loss of our long-time Trustee and faithful friend. He was always to be counted upon to be supportive of the aims and purposes of the Society. He filled our lives with the soft sound of poetry as only he could recite it. Now the stage is empty and the lights are low.

Awards and recognition

 Los Angeles Drama Critics Circle Award – Best Actor Award, for his performance as "Makak" in Derek Walcott's The Dream on Monkey Mountain,  1970 
 Bronze Wrangler, the Western Heritage Award – a shared award with the production, for Theatrical Motion Picture, for "The Cowboys," a Warner Brothers film, 1972  
 Primetime Emmy Award nomination – Outstanding Single Performance by a Supporting Actor in a Comedy or Drama Series, for ABC's Barney Miller: The Escape Artist, 1976
 Inducted into the Black Filmmakers Hall of Fame, 1977
 Primetime Emmy Award – Outstanding Guest Performer in a Comedy Series, for The Cosby Show: The Card Game, 1986
 NAACP Image Award – Outstanding Actor in a Comedy Series, for The Cosby Show, 1986 

 Los Angeles Drama Critics Circle Award – Best Actor Award, for his performance as "Bynum Walker" in August Wilson's Joe Turner's Come and Gone, 1989
 Soap Opera Digest Award nomination – Outstanding Villain: Prime Time, for Falcon Crest, 1989 
 Tony Award nomination – Best Featured Actor in a Play, for his performance as "Holloway" in August Wilson's Two Trains Running, directed by Lloyd Richards, 1992
 Helen Hayes Award – Outstanding Supporting Performer, Non-Resident Production, for Two Trains Running, 1992
 Daytime Emmy Award nomination – Outstanding Performer in an Animated Program, for his performance as "The Kingpin" in Spider-Man, 1995 
 Inducted posthumously into the American Theater Hall of Fame, 2008

Filmography

Film

 The Connection (1961) as J. J. Burden
 Pie in the Sky (1964) as Preacher
 Black Like Me (1964) as Christopher
 The Comedians (1967) as Petit Pierre
 Up Tight! (1968) as Clarence (a.k.a. "Daisy")
 Topaz (1969) as Philippe Dubois
 The Liberation of L.B. Jones (1970) as L.B. Jones
 The Cowboys (1972) as Jebediah Nightlinger
 Cisco Pike (1972) as Music Store Owner
 The Ra Expeditions (1972) as narrator (voice)
 The World's Greatest Athlete (1973) as Gazenga
 Super Fly T.N.T. (1973) as Dr. Lamine Sonko
 Uptown Saturday Night (1974) as Congressman Lincoln
 Logan's Run (1976) as Box (voice)
 Twilight's Last Gleaming (1977) as James Forrest
 The Story of Star Wars (1977) as narrator (voice)
 Nothing Personal  (1980) as Paxton
 Legal Eagles (1986) as Judge Dawkins
 Jumpin' Jack Flash (1986) as Archer Lincoln
 Moments Without Proper Names (1987)
 Oliver & Company (1988) as Francis (voice)
 Moon 44 (1990) as Chairman Hall, Galactic Mining Corp. (uncredited)
 Noel (1992) as Brutus (voice)
 The Mambo Kings (1992) as Fernando Perez
 Eddie Presley (1992) as Doc
 Naked in New York (1993) as Mr. Ried
 Last Summer in the Hamptons (1995) as Freddy
 The Pompatus of Love (1995) as Leonard Folder
 Babe (1995) as narrator (voice)
 Dear God (1996) as Idris Abraham
 Forest Warrior (1996) as Clovis Madison
 Galapagos: Beyond Darwin (1996) (voice)
 Haiti: Harvest of Hope (1997) (voice)
 Mouse Hunt (1997) [Theatrical Trailer] (voice)
 Babe: Pig in the City (1998) as The Narrator (voice)
 Judas Kiss (1998) as Chief Bleeker
 Morgan's Ferry (2001) as Peabo
 The Tulsa Lynching of 1921: A Hidden Story (2000) (voice)
 Treasure Planet (2002) as Mr. Arrow (voice)
 Behind the Broken Words (2003)
 Unchained Memories (2003) as Reader
 Sweet Deadly Dreams (2006) as Devlin
 Garfield: A Tail of Two Kitties (2006) as narrator (voice)
 Epic Movie (2007) as narrator (voice)
 Smiley Face (2007) as himself (voice)

Television

 That Was The Week That Was (US version, 1964) as himself
 NET Playhouse (1967)
 The Invaders episode "The Vise" (1968) as Arnold Andrew Warren
 Insight (1968) as Stranger
 Mannix (1968) as Dr. Andrew Josephus
 Espionage (1968)
 The Name of the Game (1969–1970) as Dean Marshall / Wamumba
 The Outcasts (1969) as Gideon
 Bonanza (1972) as Joshua
 The Flip Wilson Show (1972–1973) as himself
 All in the Family (1972–1973) as Jean Duval / Hugh Victor Thompson III
 Sanford and Son (1972) as Osgood Wilcox
 The Streets of San Francisco (1973) as Yale Courtland Dancy
 Good Times (1974) as Reverend Sam
 Barney Miller (1975) as Charlie Evans Jeffers
 Starsky and Hutch (1977) as Quatraine
 Maude (1977–1978) as Mr. Butterfield
 King (miniseries) (1978) as Philip Harrison
 Soap (1979–1981) as Saunders (regular role)
 Benson (1980) as Howard Walker
 Hart to Hart (1981)
 Magnum, P.I. (1983) as Carlton
 For Us the Living: The Medgar Evers Story (1983) as Gloster Current
 The Cosby Show (1986–1987) as Dr. Barnabus Foster
 Head of the Class (1986) as Mr. Thomas
 The Greatest Adventure: Stories from the Bible (1986) as Magus (in "The Nativity") (voice)
 Foofur (1986) (voice)
 John Grin's Christmas (1986) as Ghost of Christmas Past
 227 (1987) as Albert Henry
 Visionaries: Knights of the Magical Light (1987) as Reekon / Merklynn (voice)
 The Real Ghostbusters (1988–1989) as Edward 'Big Ed' Zeddemore (voice)
 Highway to Heaven (1988) as Dr. Hudsbeth
 Falcon Crest (1988) as Rosemont
 A Different World (1988–1992) as Dr. Barnabus Foster
 Ring Raiders (1989) as Max Miles (voice)
 Columbo: Rest in Peace Mrs. Columbo (1990) as Dr. Steadman
 Bill & Ted's Excellent Adventures (1990) (voice)
 Father Dowling Mysteries (1990) as Dennis Cray
 The Pirates of Dark Water (1991) (voice)
 Law & Order (1992–2003) as Sir Idris Balewa/Aaron Miller 
 SeaQuest DSV (1993–1994) as Dr. Raleigh Young
 The John Larroquette Show (1994) as Mr. Davis
 Batman: The Animated Series (1994) as Dr. Wataki (voice)
 Spider-Man (1995–1998) as The Kingpin / Wilson Fisk (voice)
 Happily Ever After: Fairy Tales for Every Child (1995) as Friar Ferdinand (Season 1, Episode 5 "Rumpelstiltskin") (voice)
 Freakazoid! (1995) as Great Mystic Gnome (voice)
 Phantom 2040 (1995) as Old Guran (Season 2, Episode 8 "The Sins of the Fathers: Part Two") (voice)
 New York Undercover (1996) as Dr. Johnson
 Cosby (1996) as George Lucas, Hilton's Brother
 The Wild Thornberrys (1998–2000) as Komodo Dragon / Goulam (voice)
 The Proud Family (2003) as Clarence (voice)
 ER (1999) as Rev. Matthew Lynn
 Hope Island (1999) as Judge Patrick Bradley
 The Shield (2002) as Bryce Wyms
 Static Shock (2003–2004) as Dr. Anokye (voice)
 Tales of a Fly on the Wall (2004) as narrator (voice)
 Will and Grace (2004) as Linus
 Side Order of Life (2007) as Clarence

Theatre
 The Taming of the Shrew, New York Shakespeare Festival, East River Park Amphitheater, New York City, 1956.
 Soothsayer and Pindarus, Julius Caesar, New York Shakespeare Festival, East River Park Amphitheater, 1956.
 Aaron, Titus Andronicus, New York Shakespeare Festival, Theatre of Emmanuel Presbyterian Church, New York City, 1957.
 Balthazar, Romeo and Juliet, New York Shakespeare Festival, New York City, 1957.
 Cothurnus, Aria da Capo, Theatre Marquee, New York City, 1958.
 Understudy for title role, Othello, New York Shakespeare Festival, Belvedere Lake Theatre, New York City, 1958.
 Royal Baron, The Cool World, Eugene O'Neill Theatre, New York City, 1960.
 Understudy for title role, Purlie Victorious, Cort Theatre, New York City, 1961.
 Archibald Wellington, The Blacks: A Clown Show, St. Mark's Playhouse, New York City, 1961–62.
 Corporal, General Seeger, Lyceum Theatre, New York City, 1962.
 Deacon Sitter Morris, Tiger, Tiger, Burning Bright, Booth Theatre, New York City, 1962–63.
 Fool, King Lear, New York Shakespeare Festival, Delacorte Theatre, Public Theatre, New York City, 1962.
 Brecht on Brecht (revue), Theatre de Lys, now Lucille Lortel Theatre, New York City, 1962, then Arena Stage, Washington, DC, performed as a staged reading at Sheridan Square Playhouse, New York City, and at Delacorte Theatre, Public Theatre, all 1963.
 Autolycus, The Winter's Tale, New York Shakespeare Festival, Delacorte Theatre, Public Theatre, 1963.
 Narrator, The Ballad of the Sad Cafe, Martin Beck Theatre, New York City, 1963.
 Street singer, The Threepenny Opera, Arena Stage, 1963.
 Babu, Benito Cereno, American Place Theatre, New York City, beginning 1963, later produced as part of a double-bill titled The Old Glory, Theatre of St. Clement's Church, New York City, 1964.
 Hell Is Other People (readings), Theatre at Carnegie Hall, New York City, 1964.
 Male lead, The Empty Room, Village South Theatre, New York City, 1964.
 St. Just, Danton's Death, Vivian Beaumont Theatre, Lincoln Center, New York City, 1965.
 Ulysses, Troilus and Cressida, New York Shakespeare Festival, Delacorte Theatre, Public Theatre, 1965.
 Beyond the Fringe, Goodspeed Opera House, East Haddam, CT, 1966.
 Babu, Benito Cereno, Playhouse in the Park, Cincinnati, OH, 1966.
 The gardener, Sodom and Gomorrah, Playhouse in the Park, 1966.
 Mendoza, Man and Superman, Playhouse in the Park, 1966.
 Sheridan Whiteside, The Man Who Came to Dinner, Long Wharf Theatre, New Haven, CT, 1966.
 An Evening of Negro Poetry and Folk Music, Delacorte Theatre, Public Theatre, 1966; produced as A Hand Is on the Gate, Longacre Theatre, New York City, 1966; revived at Afro-American Studio, New York City, 1976–77.
 Mosca, Volpone, New York Shakespeare Festival, Mobile Theatre, New York City, 1967.
 Makak, The Dream on Monkey Mountain, Center Theatre Group, Mark Taper Forum, Los Angeles, 1970, then St. Mark's Playhouse, 1971.
 A Rap on Race, New Theatre for Now, Los Angeles, 1971–72.
 As You Like It, Pilgrimage Theatre, Los Angeles, 1973.
 Ephraim Cabot, Desire Under the Elms, The Marshall Migatz Memorial Season, Academy Festival Theatre, Lake Forest, Illinois, 1974.
 Behind the Broken Words (poetry reading), With Anthony Zerbe. Washington Theatre Club, Washington, DC, 1974, revived at American Place Theatre, 1981, and Denver Center for the Performing Arts, Denver, CO, 2002.
 Babu, Benito Cereno, American Place Theatre, 1976.
 Albert Perez Jordan, Remembrance, New York Shakespeare Festival, Other Stage, Public Theatre, New York City, 1979.
 Pantomime, Goodman Theatre, Chicago, 1981–82.
 Right Reverend J. D. Montgomery, My One and Only, St. James Theatre, New York City, 1983–84.
 M. Noirtier, The Count of Monte Cristo, Eisenhower Theatre, Kennedy Center for the Performing Arts, Washington, DC, 1985.
 Joe Turner's Come and Gone, Los Angeles Theatre Center, Los Angeles, 1989, then Pittsburgh Public Theatre, Pittsburgh, PA, 1989–90.
 Holloway, Two Trains Running, Eisenhower Theatre, Kennedy Center for the Performing Arts, 1991, then Walter Kerr Theatre, New York City, 1992.
 House of Flowers, as Roscoe Lee Brown. City Center Encores!, City Center Theatre, New York City, 2003.

Other work

Recordings

 Enjoyment of Poetry: Memorial Program for Claude McKay, Archive of Recorded Poetry and Literature, 1967.
 Poems, by Edna St. Vincent Millay, Archive of Recorded Poetry and Literature, 1968.
 Caribbean, Random House Audio, 1989.
 Selected Shorts: A Celebration of the Short Story, Listening Library, 1989.
 Martin Luther King Edition: New Testament Value Pack, World Bible Publishing Company, 1991.
 Audio Bible, World Bible Publishing, 1991.
 Bible for Today, New Testament, 1992.
 The Autobiography of Malcolm X, with Joe Morton. Simon & Schuster Audio, 1992.
 M. C. Higgins, the Great, by Virginia Hamilton Recorded Books, 1993.

 Kwanzaa Folktales, by Gordon Lewis, Warner Adult, 1994.
 The Word Workout: 10 Easy Exercises for a Stronger Vocabulary, Dove Books Audio, 1995.
 The Complete Sonnets of William Shakespeare: With A Lover's Complaint and Selected Songs, Dove Books Audio, 1996.
 The Poetry of Robert Frost, Dove Books Audio, 1996.
 Masterpieces of Modern Short Fiction, Audio Literature, 1998.
 The Haunting of Hill House, New Star Media, 1999.
 The Bible: Old Testament, King James Version, Audio Literature, 2001.
 The Poetry of Robert Frost, New Millennium Audio, 2001.
 The Poetry of Walt Whitman, New Millennium Audio, 2001.
 KJV on Cassette: New Testament, Nelson Bibles, 2003.

Narrated the Christmas story on a Christmas card and cassette tape alongside Glenda Hayes who sung silent night

Radio appearances
 Native villager, The Endless Road, CBS Radio Workshop, CBS, 1956.
 Performer of Shakespearean roles for CBC Radio.

Writings
 An Evening of Negro Poetry and Folk Music (readings), Delacorte Theatre, Public Theatre, 1966, produced as A Hand Is on the Gate, Longacre Theatre, New York City, 1966, revived at Afro-American Studio, New York City, 1976–77.
 Behind the Broken Words (poetry reading), Washington Theatre Club, Washington, DC, 1974, revived at American Place Theatre, New York City, 1981, and Denver Center for the Performing Arts, 2002.

References

External links

 
 
 Roscoe Lee Browne on Internet Theatre Database
 
 Roscoe Lee Browne at Encyclopedia.com. Retrieved March 1, 2016.
 Roscoe Lee Browne profile, at the University of Wisconsin's Actors Studio audio collection. Retrieved March 19, 2015.
 Roscoe Lee Browne's oral history video excerpts, visionaryproject.com. Retrieved March 19, 2015. 
 Roscoe Lee Browne biography, TheHistoryMakers.com. Retrieved March 19, 2015.
 Profile, blackpast.org. Retrieved March 19, 2015.
 Roscoe Lee Browne: My Childhood (video interview). The National Visionary Leadership Project (NVLP)

1922 births
2007 deaths
20th-century American male actors
African-American male actors
American male film actors
American male stage actors
American male television actors
American male voice actors
Audiobook narrators
Emmy Award winners
Male actors from New Jersey
People from Woodbury, New Jersey
Columbia University alumni
Deaths from cancer in California
Deaths from stomach cancer
Lincoln University (Pennsylvania) faculty
Lincoln University (Pennsylvania) alumni
Middlebury College alumni
University of Florence alumni
Woodbury Junior-Senior High School alumni
United States Army personnel of World War II
20th-century African-American people
21st-century African-American people